This is a list of events in Scottish television from 2000.

Events

January
No events.

February
 28 February – Having decided not to adopt the 1999 ITV generic look, Scottish and Grampian launch a new on-screen logo.

March
 No events.

April
 Capital Radio buys Border Television.

May to December
 No events.

Unknown
 ITV's Gaelic news bulletin Telefios is axed.

Debuts

BBC
27 February – Monarch of the Glen on BBC One (2000–2005)
7 August – Tinsel Town on BBC Two (2000–2001)

ITV
5 January – Meeow! on Scottish Television (2000–2003)
11 May – Harry and the Wrinklies on Scottish Television (2000–2002)
August – Inside Out on Scottish Television (2000)

Television series
Scotsport (1957–2008)
Reporting Scotland (1968–1983; 1984–present)
Scotland Today (1972–2009)
Sportscene (1975–present)
The Beechgrove Garden (1978–present)
Grampian Today (1980–2009)
High Road (1980–2003)
Taggart (1983–2010)
Crossfire (1984–2004)
Wheel of Fortune (1988–2001)
Win, Lose or Draw (1990–2004)
Only an Excuse? (1993–2020)
Chewin' the Fat (1999–2002)
Harry and the Wrinklies (1999–2002)

Ending this year
December – Inside Out (2000)
Unknown – Telefios (1993–2000)

See also
2000 in Scotland

References

 
Television in Scotland by year
2000s in Scottish television